Sophie Anderson may refer to:

 Sophie Anderson (actress) (born 1987), English pornographic actress
 Sophie Anderson (author), British writer; finalist in the 2019 Waterstones Children's Book Prize in the "younger fiction" category
 Sophie Gengembre Anderson (1823–1903), French-born British artist